Anthony Traill may refer to:

 Anthony Traill (college provost) (1838–1914), provost of Trinity College Dublin
 Anthony Traill (linguist) (1939–2007), South African linguist
 Anthony Traill (priest) (1755–1831), rector of Skull and Archdeacon of Connor in Ireland, father of Robert Traill